Alexander Edward Bain (22 January 1936 – 2014) was a professional footballer, who played for teams in both Scotland and England.

He scored two goals for in an extraordinary match between Charlton Athletic and Huddersfield Town that took place on 21 December 1957 at Charlton Athletic's home ground, The Valley.  Charlton played most of the match with 10 men after their captain Derek Ufton was injured, and Huddersfield were leading 5–1 with just 27 minutes remaining.  At that point, Johnny Summers began an extraordinary passage of play in which he scored five goals and assisted with two others to allow Charlton to win 7–6.  Huddersfield become the first, and still the only, team to score six goals in an English Football League match – or indeed any other professional football match – and still be on the losing side.

References

External links
Falkirk FC obituary

1936 births
2014 deaths
AFC Bournemouth players
Chesterfield F.C. players
Falkirk F.C. players
Association football forwards
Huddersfield Town A.F.C. players
Motherwell F.C. players
Footballers from Edinburgh
Scottish Football League players
Scottish footballers
English Football League players
Date of death missing